Diastolic heart murmurs are heart murmurs heard during diastole, i.e. they start at or after S2 and end before or at S1. Many involve stenosis of the atrioventricular valves or regurgitation of the semilunar valves.

Types
 Early diastolic murmurs start at the same time as S2 with the close of the semilunar (aortic & pulmonary) valves and typically end before S1. Common causes include aortic or pulmonary regurgitation and left anterior descending artery stenosis.
 Mid-diastolic  murmurs start after S2 and end before S1. They are due to turbulent flow across the atrioventricular (mitral & tricuspid) valves during the rapid filling phase from mitral or tricuspid stenosis.
 Late diastolic (presystolic) murmurs start after S2 and extend up to S1 and have a crescendo configuration.  They can be associated with AV valve narrowing. They include mitral stenosis, tricuspid stenosis, myxoma, and complete heart block.

Individual murmurs

Early diastolic

Mid-diastolic

Late diastolic

References

Heart murmurs